The 1904 World Allround Speed Skating Championships took place at 6 and 7 February 1904 at the ice rink Gamle Frogner Stadion in Kristiania, Norway.

There was no defending champion. Petter Sinnerud won all four distances and became World Champion, but after it was found that he had once participated in a professional match in the United States, against the rules of the ISU, he was disqualified. Sigurd Mathisen, who originally came second, was declared World Champion.

Allround results 

  * = Fell
 NC = Not classified
 NF = Not finished
 NS = Not started
 DQ = Disqualified
Source: SpeedSkatingStats.com

Rules 
Four distances have to be skated:
 500m
 1500m
 5000m
 10000m

One could only win the World Championships by winning at least three of the four distances, so there would be no World Champion if no skater won at least three distances.

Silver and bronze medals were not awarded.

References 

World Allround Speed Skating Championships, 1904
1904 World Allround
World Allround, 1904
International sports competitions in Oslo
1904 in Norwegian sport
February 1904 sports events
1900s in Oslo